Kwela Books is a South African publishing house founded in Cape Town in 1994 as a new imprint of NB Publishers.

1994-2004
In the first ten years it published several books.

Notable publications
 Kafka's Curse by Achmat Dangor
 Bitter Fruit by Achmat Dangor
 Underground People by Lewis Nkosi
 The Quiet Violence of Dreams by K. Sello Duiker, 2001
 Shark's Egg by Henrietta Rose-Innes, 2000
 Vatmaar by A.H.M. Scholtz, 
 Confessions of a Gambler by Rayda Jacobs, 20XX - winner of The Sunday Times Fiction Prize 2004
 Ons is nie almal so nie by Jeanne Goosen
 Kleur kom nooit alleen nie by Antjie Krog

2004-present
Post 2004 Kwela continued to publish, winning several awards.

Notable publications

 Dog Eat Dog by Niq Mhlongo, 2004 - winner of the 2005 Mar des Lettras Prize 
 All We Have Left Unsaid by Maxine Case, 2006 – winner of 2007 Commonwealth Writers' Prize for Best First Book, Africa Region and joint winner of the 2007 Herman Charles Bosman Prize for English Fiction. 
 Behind Every Successful Man by Zukiswa Wanner, 2008 - 
 The Dream in the Next Body by Gabeba Baderoon, 2005 - winner of the 2005 Daimler-Chrysler Prize. 
 The Rowing Lesson by Anne Landsman, 2008 - winner of The Sunday Times Fiction Prize 2009. 
 Happiness is a Four-Letter Word by Cynthia Jele, 2010 - winner of 2011 Commonwealth Writers' Prize for Best First Book, Africa Region and the M-Net Film Prize 2011 at the M-Net Literary Awards. 
 Homemaking for the Down-at-Heart by Finuala Dowling, 2011 - winner of the M-Net Prize for English Fiction 2012. 
 Young Blood by Sifiso Mzobe, 2010 - winner of The Sunday Times Fiction Prize 2011, the 2010 Herman Charles Bosman Prize for English Fiction, the SALA
 Room 207 by Kgebetli Moele, 2006 - joint winner of the 2007 Herman Charles Bosman Prize for English Fiction and the University of Johannesburg Prize for debut fiction. 
 Die staat teen Anna Bruwer by Anchien Troskie, 2012
 The Lazarus Effect by H. J. Golakai, 2011 - shortlisted for The Sunday Times Fiction Prize 2012.
 Moss by Mary Watson, 2004 - 
 Siegfreid by Willem Anker, 2007 - winner of 
 Ancient Rites by Diale Tlholwe - winner of the SALA
 Beauty's Gift by Sindiwe Magona, 2008 -
 Small Moving Parts by Sally-Ann Murray, 2009 - winner of the M-Net Prize for English Fiction 2010

References

External links 
 

Book publishing companies of South Africa